The international solo singing competition "Lazar Jovanović" is an annual opera competition held in Belgrade. It is one of the most important and largest opera competitions in Serbia and in this part of Europe.  It features solo singers of all ages who may or may not be educated within the official music education system, and welcomes over a hundred participants from a dozen countries each year. The competition is of an international character and is named after the famous Serbian opera singer Lazar Jovanović. The owner and organizer of the competition is the Cultural Element organization.

History
The competition was founded in 2003 as part of the work of the Music Society "Stanković" in honor of the famous Serbian tenor Lazar Jovanović. From its founding until 2015, it was held in the premises of the Music School Stanković. Then, due to the exceptional increase in importance and significance, it has been held since 2016 under the auspices of the Cultural Element organization, which introduces organizational and artistic novelties, and which moves the competition from the halls of music school to the Ilija M. Kolarac Endowment. Every year, the competition welcomes over a hundred participants from almost ten countries. So far, some of the biggest names in the domestic and world music scene and pedagogy have appeared in the competition jury, and the winners of the competition have confirmed themselves as excellent musicians in recent years, conquering world concert podiums and opera stages.

References

External links
https://takmicenjelazarjovanovic.com/

Opera competitions
Singing competitions